Muhammad Rizwan born 6 April 1989 is a Pakistani professional international Kabaddi player. He was member of the Pakistan national kabaddi team that won Asian bronze medals in 2014 Asian Games in Incheon.

References

Living people
1989 births
Pakistani kabaddi players
Asian Games medalists in kabaddi
Kabaddi players at the 2014 Asian Games
Kabaddi players at the 2018 Asian Games
Asian Games bronze medalists for Pakistan
Medalists at the 2014 Asian Games
Medalists at the 2018 Asian Games
21st-century Pakistani people